The 2000 Cheltenham Gold Cup was a horse race which took place at Cheltenham on Thursday 16 March 2000. It was the 73rd running of the Cheltenham Gold Cup, and it was won by Looks Like Trouble. The winner was ridden by Richard Johnson and trained by Noel Chance. The pre-race favourite See More Business finished fourth.

It was the second victory in the Gold Cup for Noel Chance, who had won the race three years earlier with Mr Mulligan. The winning time of 6m 30.3s set a new record – the previous best was 6m 30.9s in 1990.

Race details
 Sponsor: Tote
 Winner's prize money: £162,400.00
 Going: Good to Firm
 Number of runners: 12
 Winner's time: 6m 30.3s (new record)

Full result

* The distances between the horses are shown in lengths or shorter. nk = neck; PU = pulled-up; UR = unseated rider.† Trainers are based in Great Britain unless indicated.

Winner's details
Further details of the winner, Looks Like Trouble:

 Foaled: 7 May 1992 in Ireland
 Sire: Zaffaran; Dam: Lavengaddy (Balgaddy)
 Owner: Tim Collins
 Breeder: Stephen Reel

References
 
 sportinglife.com
 bbc.co.uk – "Trouble secures Cheltenham Gold" – March 16, 2000.

Cheltenham Gold Cup
 2000
Cheltenham Gold Cup
Cheltenham Gold Cup
2000s in Gloucestershire